Moravian enclaves in Silesia were parts of Moravia, but from 1783 until 1928 they were governed by Silesian authorities according to Moravian legislation. They ceased to exist on December 1, 1928 (the day of creation of the province Moravia and Silesia). In fact, most of them were exclaves of Moravia, but in one case its foreland.

Territories of enclaves 
1) municipality Bohušov, (2) municipality Dívčí Hrad, (3) municipality Hlinka, (4) municipality Janov, (5) municipality Jindřichov, (6) municipality Liptaň, (7) municipality Osoblaha, (8) municipality Petrovice, (9) almost all of municipality Rusín, (10) almost all of municipality Slezské Pavlovice, (11) municipality Slezské Rudoltice, (12) municipality Vysoká; cadastral areas: (13) Piskořov (part of municipality Město Albrechtice) and (14) Třemešná (part of municipality Třemešná).
(15) municipality Lhotka u Litultovic, (16) almost all of municipality Litultovice (without its settlement Choltice), (17) municipality Dolní Životice, (18) municipality Mikolajice, (19) municipality Uhlířov, (20) municipality Slavkov; cadastral areas: (21) Deštné (part of municipality Jakartovice), (22) Jaktař (part of municipality Opava), (23) Štáblovice (part of municipality Štáblovice).
(24) almost all of cadastral area Vlaštovičky (part of municipality Opava).
(25) municipality Slatina including its former settlements Ohrada (part of municipality Bílovec) and Karlovice (part of municipality Tísek).
(26) almost all of cadastral area Suché Lazce (part of municipality Opava), but without its settlement Přerovec, but including its former settlement Kravařov (part of municipality Opava).

Cadastral areas Butovice (27) (part of municipality Studénka) and Nové Vrbno (28) (part of municipality Větřkovice) were not part of Moravian enclaves in Silesia but integral part of Moravia.

Moravia
Moravian-Silesian Region
Former enclaves